Zinc acetylacetonate is an acetylacetonate complex of zinc, with the chemical formula of . The compound is in fact a trimer, Zn3(acac)6, in which each Zn ion is coordinated by five oxygen atoms in a distorted trigonal bipyramidal structure.

Preparation 

Zinc acetylacetonate can be obtained by reacting zinc sulfate, acetylacetone and sodium hydroxide.

Properties 

Zinc acetylacetonate is a crystalline substance that is slightly soluble in water. Through sublimation, monomer crystals can be obtained, which are monoclinic and have the space group C2/c (No. 15). Trimeric crystals can also be obtained by sublimation, which is also monoclinic, with space group C2 (No. 5). The structures of its monohydrate and dihydrate are also known.

Reactions 

Zinc acetylacetonate hydrate has been used to prepare magnetic (Zn,Fe)Fe2O4 films, zinc oxide, and is also a catalyst for organic synthesis.

References 

Acetylacetonate complexes
Zinc compounds